Reno is a hamlet in northern Alberta, Canada, within Northern Sunrise County. It is probably named after Reno, Nevada.

Demographics 

See also 
List of communities in Alberta
List of designated places in Alberta
List of hamlets in Alberta

References 

Hamlets in Alberta
Designated places in Alberta
Northern Sunrise County